Daley Yesid Mena Palomeque (born 7 February 1985) is a Colombian professional footballer, who plays as a striker.

Mena began his playing career in Uruguay with Danubio, in 2009 he joined Colón de Santa Fe of Argentina but returned to Danubio after only one season.

In 2011 he became a Querétaro player.

Club career

Audaz
Mena signed with Audaz of the Salvadoran Primera División in the Apertura 2017 tournament. Audaz was the team promoted in that tournament. He greatest success with the team of San Vicente was reaching the semi-finals of the Clausura 2018 tournament, after defeating FAS 3–2 in the Estadio Óscar Quiteño. However, Audaz was eliminated by Santa Tecla after a 2–5 defeat on aggregate.

Alianza
Mena signed with Alianza in the Apertura 2018 tournament. He scored two goals in a 5–2 victory against Sonsonate in the Estadio Anna Mercedes Campos. Alianza got to qualify for the quarter-finals of the Apertura 2018 after finishing in first position with 49 points.

Honours
Danubio
Uruguayan Primera División (1): 2006–07

Dorados
Copa MX (1): Apertura 2012

References

External links
 Daley Mena at Soccerway 

1985 births
Living people
People from Quibdó
Colombian footballers
Colombian expatriate footballers
Association football forwards
Danubio F.C. players
Club Atlético Colón footballers
Querétaro F.C. footballers
Dorados de Sinaloa footballers
Deportivo Cali footballers
Rocha F.C. players
Uruguayan Primera División players
Argentine Primera División players
Liga MX players
Expatriate footballers in Argentina
Expatriate footballers in Uruguay
Expatriate footballers in Mexico
Sportspeople from Chocó Department